Lex Malacitana or Lex Flavia Malacitana ("Flavian law of Malaca") is a bronze tablet bearing Latin local statutes which deal with the official activities of the duoviri iuri dicundo. The tablet was found in the 20th century near Malaca (modern Málaga) with the lex Salpensana, and it was dated from AD 81–84, i.e. the early reign of Domitian. Malaca was governed under this law, which granted free-born persons the privileges of Roman citizenship.

Together with the lex Salpensana and the lex Irnitana it provides the most complete version of the lex Flavia municipalis, or the Flavian municipal law. and has allowed new insights into the workings of Roman law. The tablets are exhibited in the National Archaeological Museum, Madrid. Since the tablets provide the only surviving copy of large parts of the Flavian municipal law, they have provided new insights into the procedural side of municipal courts.

In December 2016 a petition to Congreso de los Diputados was offered to give it back to the Museo de Málaga. The Ministerio de Cultura studied the case, and on 12 March 2018 Spanish Government denied it.

References

Bibliography
 

History of Málaga
Collection of the National Archaeological Museum, Madrid
1st-century Latin texts
Latin inscriptions
Archaeological discoveries in Spain
1st-century artifacts
1st-century inscriptions
Archaeological palettes
Roman law